Paul J. Marwin (February 21, 1885 - November 29, 1931) was  a lawyer who served as a member of the Minnesota House of Representatives.

Biography
Marwin was born in Lund, Wisconsin. He graduated from North Park University and the University of Minnesota.  In 1890, he came to Minneapolis, Minnesota where he was engaged as an attorney in active practice. He was elected to the Minnesota House of Representatives in District 29 serving  from 1915 to 1918.  Marwin died during 1931 in  Hennepin County, Minnesota.

References

External links
Find a Grave

People from Pierce County, Wisconsin
Members of the Minnesota House of Representatives
Minnesota lawyers
North Park University alumni
University of Minnesota alumni
1885 births
1931 deaths
20th-century American politicians
American people of Swedish descent
20th-century American lawyers